Maryland's Legislative District 46 is one of 47 districts in Maryland for representation in the state legislature. It is located entirely in Baltimore City and encompasses all or part of at least six city council districts, including the First district, Second district, Tenth district, Eleventh district, Twelfth district and Thirteenth district.

Voters in this district select three delegates every four years to represent them in the Maryland House of Delegates.

Demographic characteristics
As of the 2020 United States census, the district had a population of 124,898, of whom 101,213 (81.0%) were of voting age. The racial makeup of the district was 58,975 (47.2%) White, 33,946 (27.2%) African American, 949 (0.8%) Native American, 4,987 (4.0%) Asian, 27 (0.0%) Pacific Islander, 15,887 (12.7%) from some other race, and 10,130 (8.1%) from two or more races. Hispanic or Latino of any race were 24,224 (19.4%) of the population.

The district had 74,540 registered voters as of October 17, 2020, of whom 13,962 (18.7%) were registered as unaffiliated, 10,576 (14.2%) were registered as Republicans, 48,847 (65.5%) were registered as Democrats, and 656 (0.9%) were registered to other parties.

Political representation
The district is represented for the 2023–2027 legislative term in the State Senate by Bill Ferguson (D) and in the House of Delegates by Luke Clippinger (D), Robbyn Lewis (D) and Mark Edelson (D).

Election results

References

Baltimore
46
46